Miscoe Lake is a reservoir in Cumberland, Providence County, Rhode Island. It has also been known as Grants Mills Pond and Miso Meadow Pond.

Located at the southern part of the lake is historical Grant's Mill. It resides on Miscoe Lake Dam, also known as Grants Mill Pond Dam, which was built in 1937. Its capacity is 244 acre feet with normal storage of 226 acre feet.

Wildlife 
The lake is home to many wildlife species, including beavers, swans, herons, cormorants, turtles, and is a temporary habitat for Canada geese. Fish species include Largemouth bass, Chain pickerel, and Bluegill.

References

External links
Images of Miscoe Lake and Grant Mills from the early 1900s

Reservoirs in Massachusetts
Reservoirs in Rhode Island
Cumberland, Rhode Island
Lakes of Providence County, Rhode Island
Buildings and structures in Providence County, Rhode Island
Buildings and structures in Norfolk County, Massachusetts
Lakes of Norfolk County, Massachusetts
Protected areas of Providence County, Rhode Island
Protected areas of Norfolk County, Massachusetts